The Songdowŏn Line is an electrified secondary railway line of the Korean State Railway in Wŏnsan Municipal City, North Korea, running from Segil on the Kangwŏn Line to Songdowŏn.  

It is not known when the line from Wŏnsan (actually, the line branches off from Segil) to Songdowŏn was opened, but the Songdowŏn−Segil section was opened on 23 September 2014, with a special ceremonial train marking the opening; this inaugural train was pulled by a Sŏngun Red Flag-class locomotive.

Songdowŏn is the site of the Songdowŏn International Children's Union Camp, and there is a resort.

Route 

A yellow background in the "Distance" box indicates that section of the line is not electrified.

References

Railway lines in North Korea
Standard gauge railways in North Korea
Railway lines opened in 2014